The 1996–97 Cymru Alliance was the seventh season of the Cymru Alliance after its establishment in 1990. The league was won by Rhayader Town.

League table

External links
Cymru Alliance

Cymru Alliance seasons
2
Wales